Events in the year 1923 in Brazil.

Incumbents

Federal government 
 President: Artur Bernardes 
 Vice President: Estácio de Albuquerque Coimbra

Governors 
 Alagoas: José Fernandes de Barros Lima 
 Amazonas: César do Rego Monteiro
 Bahia: José Joaquim Seabra
 Ceará: 
 till 12 July: Justiniano de Serpa
 from 12 July: Ildefonso Albano
 Goiás:
 till 27 July: Eugênio Rodrigues Jardim
 from 27 July: Miguel da Rocha Lima
 Maranhão:
 till 20 January: Raul da Cunha Machado
 from 20 January: Godofredo Mendes Viana
 Mato Grosso: Pedro Celestino Corrêa da Costa
 Minas Gerais: Raul Soares
 Pará: Antônio Emiliano de Sousa
 Paraíba: Sólon Barbosa de Lucena
 Paraná: Caetano Munhoz da Rocha
 Pernambuco: Sérgio Teixeira Lins de Barros Loreto
 Piauí: João Luís Ferreira
 Rio Grande do Norte: Antonio José de Melo e Sousa
 Rio Grande do Sul: Antônio Augusto Borges de Medeiros
 Santa Catarina:
 São Paulo: 
 Sergipe:

Vice governors 
 Rio Grande do Norte:
 São Paulo:

Events 
 date unknown
 The Brazilian Society of Chemistry is founded.
 Brazil's first radio broadcasting station, the Radio Society of Rio de Janeiro, is founded; it is still working under the name Rádio MEC.
 Medeiros e Albuquerque becomes President of the Academia Brasileira de Letras.
 Construction of the Basilica of Our Lady of Lourdes, Belo Horizonte was completed.

Arts and culture

Films 
A Canção da Primavera, directed by Igino Bonfioli and Cyprien Segur.
Augusto Anibal quer casar, directed by Luiz de Barros
João da Mata, directed by and starring Amilar Alves

Births 
11 January – Sérgio Porto, writer (died 1968)
22 January – Marcus Vinícius Dias, basketball player (died 1992)
19 April – Lygia Fagundes Telles, novelist and writer (died 2022)
16 August – Millôr Fernandes, journalist, cartoonist, humorist and playwright (died 2012) 
30 October – Lourdinha Bittencourt, actress (died 1979)
1 November – Newton Holanda Gurgel, Bishop of Crato 1993-2001 (died 2017)
14 November – Cleyde Yáconis, actress (died 2013)

Deaths 
1 March – Rui Barbosa, writer and politician (born 1849)
11 March – Júlia da Silva Bruhns, mother of Thomas Mann (born 1851)

References

See also 
1923 in Brazilian football

 
1920s in Brazil
Years of the 20th century in Brazil
Brazil
Brazil